Casole d'Elsa [ˈkaːzole] is a comune (municipality) in the Province of Siena in the Italian region Tuscany, located about  southwest of Florence and about  west of Siena.

Main sights
The church of San Niccolò, of Romanesque origin, has a nave and four aisles divided by columns and semicolumns, with two semicircular apses with mullioned windows. The central portal is from the early 14th century, while the portico is modern. It has 17th-century frescoes by Rustichino and, at the high altar, one 14th century Madonna of the Sienese School.

The collegiata di Santa Maria Assunta was consecrated in 1161; of the original Romanesque edifice, the façade remains with the bell tower. The upper part is decorated with blinds arches divided by slender semicolumns. The transept is from the 14th century. The interior houses the tombs of Beltramo Aringhieri, by Marco Romano (early 14th century), and of bishop Tommaso Andrei, by Gano di Fazio (1303). Annexed to the church is a Museum of Sacred Art with works by Domenico di Michelino, Alessandro Casolani and others.

The Pieve of San Giovanni Battista, at Mensano, is also from the 12th century. Notable are the sculpted capitals of the columns dividing nave and aisles, considered amongst the finest examples of Romanesque sculpture in the Siena area. From the same period and style is the Pieve di San Giovanni Battista, at Pievescola.

Casole d'Elsa is also home to the world-renowned Verrocchio Art Centre offering fine art courses, painting holidays, sculpture courses, studios and accommodation. Nigel Konstam is the resident director and a sculptor whose work is firmly based in the European tradition.

References

Sources

External links

 Official website
 Official Palio Casole d'Elsa website
 Official Verrocchio Art Centre website
Casali Di Casole

Hilltowns in Tuscany